Mathías Olivera Miramontes (born 31 October 1997) is a Uruguayan professional footballer who plays as a left-back for  club Napoli and the Uruguay national team.

Club career

Uruguay
Born in Montevideo, Olivera is a Nacional youth graduate. After progressing through the youth setup, he made his professional debut on 13 February 2016, starting and being booked in a 3–0 away win against River Plate.

Olivera appeared in only one further match for the club, a 0–2 loss at Plaza Colonia on 29 February 2016. In December of that year, he was bought outright by his agent Daniel Fonseca and assigned to Atenas de San Carlos in Segunda División.

In July 2017, Oliveira passed a medical at Galatasaray, but eventually did not sign a contract and subsequently returned to Uruguay.

Getafe
On 14 August 2017, Olivera signed a six-year deal with La Liga club Getafe. He scored his first professional goal on 21 April 2018, netting the game's only in a 1–0 win against Eibar.

Albacete (loan)
On 4 July 2018, Segunda División side Albacete announced the signing of Olivera on a season long loan deal. He played 15 matches and scored a goal for the club before his loan was cut short by Getafe on 25 January 2019.

Napoli
On 26 May 2022, Italian club Napoli announced the signing of Olivera on a three-year deal.

International career
Olivera is a former Uruguay youth international. He was part of Uruguay under-20 team which won 2017 South American U-20 Championship and finished fourth at 2017 FIFA U-20 World Cup.

On 7 January 2022, Olivera was named in Uruguay's 50-man preliminary squad for FIFA World Cup qualifying matches against Paraguay and Venezuela. He made his senior team debut on 27 January 2022 in a 1–0 win against Paraguay.

Career statistics

Club

International

References

External links
 Profile at the S.S.C. Napoli website
 
 
 

1997 births
Living people
Footballers from Montevideo
Association football defenders
Uruguayan footballers
Uruguayan Primera División players
Club Nacional de Football players
La Liga players
Segunda División players
Getafe CF footballers
Albacete Balompié players
S.S.C. Napoli players
2022 FIFA World Cup players
Uruguay youth international footballers
Uruguay under-20 international footballers
Uruguay international footballers
Uruguayan expatriate footballers
Uruguayan expatriate sportspeople in Spain
Expatriate footballers in Spain
Uruguayan expatriate sportspeople in Italy
Expatriate footballers in Italy